West Virginia Route 74 is a north–south state highway in northwest West Virginia, United States. The southern terminus of the route is at West Virginia Route 47 in Coxs Mills. The northern terminus is at West Virginia Route 18 at Josephs Mills.

Major intersections

References

074
Transportation in Gilmer County, West Virginia
Transportation in Ritchie County, West Virginia
Transportation in Tyler County, West Virginia